The Wheel of Love and Other Stories is the third short story collection by Joyce Carol Oates. It was published in 1970 by  Vanguard Press. 

While the book itself is out of print, several of the stories—"Where Are You Going, Where Have You Been?", "Unmailed, Unwritten Letters", "In the Region of Ice", and "Wild Saturday"—have been included in other collections and anthologies. It was a finalist for the 1970 Pulitzer Prize for Fiction.

Margaret Groppi Rozga states that it represents a further development in her fiction in so far as "the characters are now almost always urban, rather than rural, people and are financially established, rather than threatened with poverty." But most important is the further developed consciousness of the characters in The Wheel of Love in comparison to the characters in Oates's first two volumes of short fiction:What is most noticeable in The Wheel of Love, Oates' third collection of stories, is how much more conscious and self-conscious some of these characters are, or become in the course of their stories. Foremost in their consciousness is a sense of incongruity, an awareness of the contradictions in their lives and in the world around them. Their consciousness is consciousness of pain, of danger, of how little they are what they would be. These characters have no answers to the problems of which they are conscious. But their consciousness gives them more sense of themselves as individuals, separate from but in some ways related to the world around them, and, most important, because they are not so self-absorbed, then, they are not so thoughtless of others, a major change almost unacknowledged in the commentaries on Oates' fiction.

Stories 

 "You"
 "Bodies"
 "Demons"
 "I Was in Love"
 "What Is the Connection between Men and Women?"
 "Wild Saturday"
 "An Interior Monologue"
 "Matter & Energy"
 "Convalescing"
 "How I Contemplated the World from the Detroit House of Correction and Began My Life over Again"
 "Boy and Girl"
 "Unmailed, Unwritten Letters"
 "Accomplished Desires"
 "The Heavy Sorrow of the Body"
 "Shame"
 "The Wheel of Love"
 "Four Summers"
 "In the Region of Ice"
 "Where Are You Going, Where Have You Been?"
 "Assailant"

References 

1970 short story collections
Short story collections by Joyce Carol Oates
Vanguard Press books